Chenar Heyl (also Romanized as Chenār Heyl; also known as Chenar) is a village in Kakavand-e Gharbi Rural District, Kakavand District, Delfan County, Lorestan Province, Iran. At the 2006 census, its population was 42, in 7 families.

References 

Towns and villages in Delfan County